Makari is a small village in Tonkolili District, Northern Province, of Sierra Leone, West Africa. It is located on a hill above the right (north) bank of the Pampana River.

Notes

Villages in Sierra Leone
Northern Province, Sierra Leone